WHMG-LP (98.7 FM) is a Catholic religious formatted broadcast radio station licensed to and serving Purgitsville, West Virginia.  WHMG-LP is owned and operated by Holy Spirit Study Institute, Ltd.

External links
 

Catholic radio stations
Radio stations established in 2003
HMG-LP
HMG-LP